The 460th Bombardment Squadron was a unit of the United States Army Air Forces.  Its last was assigned to the 333d Bombardment Group, stationed at Kadena Air Base, Okinawa.  It was inactivated on 28 May 1946.

History

Training unit

Established as a B-24 Liberator very heavy bomb squadron in 1944.  Mission was as an Operational Training Unit (OTU) under II Bomber Command training B-24 replacement pilots and aircrew.

Deployment to the Pacific
The squadron was again activated at Dalhart on 7 July 1944, but this time was assigned to the 333d Bombardment Group.  The 333d Group was also a former heavy bomber training unit that had been inactivated in the spring of 1944 in a general Army Air Forces reorganization of its training and support units. It was reactivated in July as a Boeing B-29 Superfortress group.  The squadron trained with Superfortresses until June 1945, when it departed for the Pacific to become an element of Eighth Air Force, which was organizing on Okinawa as a second very heavy bomber air force in the Pacific.  However, the squadron did not arrive at its combat station, Kadena Airfield, until it was too late to participate in combat.  The squadron flew show-of-force missions and its aircraft helped evacuate prisoners of war from Japan to airfields in the Philippines. The unit was inactivated on 28 May 1946.

In September 1947, all former Air Corps units were transferred from the Army to the Air Force, including inactive units like the 460 BS.

Lineage
 Constituted as the 460th Bombardment Squadron (Heavy) on 1 July 1942
 Activated on 6 July 1942
 Inactivated on 1 April 1944
 Redesignated 460th Bombardment Squadron, Very Heavy
 Activated on 1 April 1944
 Inactivated on 10 May 1944
 Activated on 7 July 1944
 Inactivated on 28 May 1946

Assignments
 330th Bombardment Group, 6 July 1942 – 1 April 1944
 330th Bombardment Group, 1 April 1944 – 10 May 1944
 333d Bombardment Group, 7 July 1944 – 28 May 1946

Stations

 Salt Lake City Army Air Base, Utah, 6 July 1942
 Alamogordo Army Air Field, New Mexico, 1 August 1942
 Biggs Field, Texas, 2 September 1942
 Alamogordo Army Air Field, New Mexico, 1 December 1942
 Biggs Field, Texas, 5 April 1943 – 1 April 1944

 Walker Army Air Field, Kansas, 1 April-10 May 1944
 Dalhart Army Airfield, Texas, 7 July 1944
 Great Bend Army Air Field, Kansas, 10 December 1944 – 18 June 1945
 Kadena Airfield, Okinawa, 5 August 1945 – 28 May 1946

Aircraft
 Consolidated B-24 Liberator, 1942–1944
 Boeing B-29 Superfortress, 1944–1946

References

Bibliography

 
 
 

Strategic bombing squadrons of the United States Army Air Forces
Military units and formations established in 1942